Bourtaïl is a sub-prefecture of Ouaddaï Region in Chad.

References 

Populated places in Chad